The Autana Municipality is one of the seven municipalities (municipios) that makes up the southern Venezuelan state of Amazonas and, according to the 2011 census by the National Institute of Statistics of Venezuela, the municipality has a population of 8,352.  The town of Isla Ratón is the shire town of the Autana Municipality.

History
The shiretown of the Autana Municipality, Isla de Ratón, was founded by a group led by Pedro Loroima in 1943.

Demographics
The Autana Municipality, according to a 2007 population estimate by the National Institute of Statistics of Venezuela, has a population of 8,181 (up from 6,524 in 2000). This amounts to 5.8% of the state's population.

Government
The mayor of the Autana Municipality is Bernabe Arana, re-elected on October 31, 2004, with 45% of the vote.  The municipality is divided into four parishes; Samariapo, Sipapo, Munduapo, and Guayapo (previous to December 18, 1997, the Autana Municipality contained only a single parish).

See also
Amazonas
Municipalities of Venezuela

References

External links
autana-amazonas.gob.ve  

Municipalities of Amazonas (Venezuelan state)